Thomas Hart Rochester (September 23, 1797 – October 6, 1874) was the 6th son of Colonel Nathaniel Rochester and the 6th mayor of Rochester, New York.

Rochester was born in Hagerstown, Maryland and moved with his family to Dansville, New York in 1810. Rochester was the first of his family to move to the land his father Nathaniel, Charles Carroll, and William Fitzhugh purchased next to the High Falls of the Genesee River. When his family followed him to the city two years later, he decided to move briefly to Missouri before returning and marrying Phebe E. Cuming, the daughter of the village of Rochester's first clergyman.

Rochester was selected by the Common Council as a Whig to be Mayor during the depression year of 1838. After his term, he became a banker and real estate developer before his death in 1874. He is interred in Mount Hope Cemetery.

His Spring Street house served as the home of the Rochester Police Locust Club from 1921 to 1964. It was demolished in 1964.

References

External links

 Known descendants of Nathaniel Rochester at Ancestry.com
 Mayors of Rochester at WorldStatesmen.org
 

1797 births
1874 deaths
Burials at Mount Hope Cemetery (Rochester)
Mayors of Rochester, New York
People from Dansville, New York
19th-century American politicians
People from Hagerstown, Maryland
New York (state) Whigs